France was represented by Guy Bonnet, with the song "Vivre", at the 1983 Eurovision Song Contest, which took place on 23 April in Munich. Bonnet had previously represented France in the 1970 contest in Amsterdam.

Before Eurovision

National final 
Broadcaster Antenne 2 took over responsibility for French Eurovision participation in 1983, after the country had been absent from the 1982 contest when previous broadcaster TF1 opted out, citing the facile nature of the music on offer in Eurovision as they perceived it. Antenne 2 decided to choose their first entry via a broadcast national final.

The national final was held on 20 March 1983, hosted by Jean-Pierre Foucault and 1977 contest winner Marie Myriam. Fourteen songs took part with the winner chosen by a panel of TV viewers who were telephoned and asked to vote on the songs. Other participants included previous and future French representatives Isabelle Aubret (1962 & 1968) and Joël Prévost (1978).

At Eurovision 
On the night of the final Bonnet performed first in the running order, preceding Norway. At the close of voting "Vivre" had received 56 points, placing France 8th of the 20 entries. The French jury awarded its 12 points to contest winners Luxembourg.

Voting

References 

1983
Countries in the Eurovision Song Contest 1983
Eurovision
Eurovision